Political Studies is a peer-reviewed academic journal covering all areas of political science, established in 1953 and published quarterly by SAGE Publications on behalf of the Political Studies Association.

According to the Journal Citation Reports, the journal has a 2016 impact factor of 1.200, ranking it 76th out of 165 journals in the category "Political Science".

The journal's editorial approach is not constrained by any particular methodological or theoretical framework wishes to encourage a pluralistic approach and debate among the different approaches. Innovative submissions, which cross and challenge traditional discipline boundaries, reconsider the relationship between international and domestic politics or offer a fresh comparative perspective, are particularly welcome.

Editors 
 Andrew Hindmoor, University of Sheffield
 Matt Sleat, University of Sheffield
 Charles Pattie, University of Sheffield
 Hayley Stevenson, Universidad Torcuato di Tella, Argentina & University of Sheffield, UK

References

External links 
 

Political science journals
Publications established in 1953
Quarterly journals
English-language journals
Wiley-Blackwell academic journals
Academic journals associated with learned and professional societies of the United Kingdom